Indžikovo is a village in the municipality of Gazi Baba, North Macedonia.

Demographics
According to the 2021 census, the village had a total of 4.324 inhabitants. Ethnic groups in the village include:
Macedonians 2.983
Albanians 527
Romani 413
Persons for whom data are taken from administrative sources 287
Vlachs 32
Serbs 49
Bosniaks 13
Turks 3
Others 18

References

External links

Villages in Gazi Baba Municipality
Albanian communities in North Macedonia